The 1955 Mille Miglia was a 1,000 mile motor race held on a  course made up entirely of public roads around Italy, mostly on the outer parts of the country on April 30-May 1, 1955. Also known as the 22. edizione Mille Miglia, the 992.332 mile (1597 km) route was based on a round trip between Brescia and Rome, with start/finish in Brescia. It was the 3rd round of the 1955 World Sportscar Championship and for the Coppa Franco Mazzotti.

As in previous years, the event was race against the clock, as the cars were released at one-minute intervals. In the Mille Miglia, the smaller displacement slower cars started first late in the previous evening, and the large-bore professional cars started last early the next morning. Each car number related to their allocated start time. For example, Luigi Musso’s car had the number 651, he left Brescia at 6:51am. Some drivers went with navigators, others didn't; a number of local Italian drivers had knowledge of the routes being used and felt confident enough that they wouldn't need one.

This race was won by Mercedes-Benz factory driver Stirling Moss with the aid of his navigator Denis Jenkinson. They completed the 992-mile distance in 10 hours, 7 minutes and 48 seconds- an average speed of 99 mph (158 km/h). The two Englishmen finished 32 minutes in front of their second-placed teammate, Argentine Juan Manuel Fangio.

Typical of the very high danger of this race, 3 people- 2 drivers and 1 spectator were killed in this race. Giovanni Brinci, driving a Ferrari 212 with Dorando Malinconi hit a gate at rail crossing, overturned and crashed against a cement road sign in the village of Tortoreto Lido, just north of the 20th checkpoint at Giuilanova in Teramo about 300 miles into the race. Although Malinconi survived, Brinci was gravely injured in this accident, and would pass away in a hospital in the nearby city of Teramo the following day. An Alfa Romeo 6C 2500, #657 driven by Giannino Festari went out of control on the approach to a 90-degree turn along the Via Goito, towards the Scaricatore bridge over the Bassanello river, in the neighbourhoods of Padua, Italy, some 50 miles into his race. The accident occurred at about 08h00 on Sunday. According to eyewitnesses reports, Festari was one of three competitors who arrived together at the same time, and the Alfa went off the road and hit a group of spectators standing behind the straw bales, in a prohibited area. Fifteen people were severely injured, eleven of them were children. One of them, 4-year old Giuliano Carraro died in a hospital in Padua. And 50-year old Giuseppe Donnini, driving a Fiat 600 crashed into a parked car in Montichari near Brescia less than 20 miles from the finish, after having driven for nearly 24 consecutive hours. He suffered grave head injuries and died a few hours later in a hospital in Montichari; his co-driver Fausto Castellarin had minor injuries and survived.

Report
0.0

Entry
A total of 661 cars were entered for the event, across 12 classes based on engine sizes, ranging from up to 750cc to over 2.0-litre, for Grand Touring Cars, Touring Cars and Sport Cars. Of these, 534 cars started the event.

For this year's Mille Miglia, Ferrari, Mercedes-Benz, Maserati and Aston Martin all came to Brescia wanting to win. Scuderia Ferrari brought cars for Umberto Maglioli, Sergio Sighinolfi, Paolo Marzotto and Piero Taruffi, Aston Martin had a DB3S for Peter Collins and DB2/4s for Paul Frère and Tommy Wisdom; and Maserati only had one 300S for Cesare Perdisa. Daimler Benz AG, who were making their Championship debut in this event, had probably the strongest line-up: Juan Manuel Fangio, Stirling Moss, Hans Herrmann and Karl Kling in their Mercedes-Benz 300 SLRs. Lancia decided to put all their efforts into Grand Prix and did not attend the race.

Race

Moss and Jenkinson were the favourites to win, although they had no knowledge of the local roads despite this being Moss’s fifth attempt at the Mille Miglia. Moss was relying entirely on Jenkinson's pace notes (now used ubiquitously in modern rallying) that they had spent months before the race compiling while driving a 300SL on the route. Jenkinson's innovative pace notes were written on a home-made roller scroll.
Initially the race wasn't in favor of the Mercedes duo, as Eugenio Castellotti streaked away from the field in his privately entered Ferrari 735 LM with its powerful 4.4-litre engine. By the time the fastest cars reached the town of Ravenna on the Adriatic Sea, Castellotti was two minutes ahead of Moss/Jenkinson, but Castellotti was driving very aggressively, sliding his Ferrari through the corners, his tyres leaving large black streaks on the road. As the cars streaked down the coastline towards Pescara, Castellotti had pushed too hard, and his Ferrari suffered a mechanical failure. His teammate Marzotto had a promising start but disaster struck when a tyre blew as he was traveling at 174 mph. He was able to keep the car on the road but as he stopped to grab the spare, he noticed that it was a different size from the others, so he was forced into retirement.

Moss surged into the lead as the fastest Ferrari expired, but there was still formidable opposition, this time from the Scuderia Ferrari driver, Piero Taruffi. Taruffi, who was the last driver to leave Brescia had averaged a stunning 130 mph on the sprint down to Pescara, shattering all previous Mille Miglia speed records with his 376 S. At this time, only a thin margin now separated the lead two cars as they refuelled, with Moss snatching the advantage thanks to a quicker stop. Fangio at this stage began to develop engine problems.

The next checkpoint was in the town of L'Aquila. In order to get there, a 62.5 mile (100 km) route through the mountains had to be traversed. When Moss and Jenkinson reached this town, they were leading by 35 seconds, followed by Herrmann, Taruffi, Fangio and Kling - All the Mercedes cars entered were running 1st, 2nd, 4th, and 5th.

By this time, Jenkinson’s map-rolling device was paying off well. Moss’s supreme confidence in his co-driver allowed him to slam over blind brows in absolute confidence at around 170 mph; once the Mercedes actually flew for about 200 feet before crashing back on the tarmac. In that 28 second stop at Pescara, the 300SLR was quickly topped with 18 gallons of fuel, sufficient to reach its main stop in Rome.

The next checkpoint was the Italian capital of Rome, which was the halfway point. Moss had taken 1 hour and 6 minutes to reach Rome from L’Aquila and he had extended his lead to 1 minute and 15 seconds over Taruffi. Kling crashed just outside the city and was now out of the race. His Mercedes was up against a tree, as he crashed avoiding some spectators; luckily he only suffered broken ribs. Meanwhile, Fangio was still struggling with engine problems; his complaints were ignored by Mercedes pit personnel in Rome. Moss buckled down to tackle the most challenging and demanding section of the route. Constantly on his mind was a fierce desire to disprove one of the old sayings – ‘He who leads at Rome never finishes’.

The mountainous and twisty 140 mile (227 km) route from Rome to the next time control in Siena was a race of attrition. Perdisa and Taruffi both retired, and by the time he reached Siena, Moss had extended his lead to 5 minutes and 40 seconds over Herrmann - he had extended 1 minute and 36 seconds on Herrmann on this section alone. At this point, 690 mi (1,101 km) of distance had been covered in 6 hours, 51 minutes and 16 seconds by Moss and Jenkinson.

The next stage was from Siena to Florence, 44 mi (70 km) long. Moss had pulled out only 8 seconds over Herrmann, who was pushing hard. Fangio's engine began to make unhealthy noises, and when the mechanics checked the engine, one of the very advanced fuel injection pipes had broken; the engine in Fangio's car was now running on 7 cylinders.

After Florence was Bologna, 65 miles (107 km) away, through the fearsome Futa Pass in Tuscany - one of the most difficult parts of this race. Bologna was nearby Modena, which was home to the headquarters of both Ferrari and Maserati. Herrmann crashed on this stage and was out; Moss was at his best, out to shatter the one-hour bogey, and he was now 27 minutes and 38 seconds ahead of Fangio, and was fastest on this section, 4½ minutes ahead of Magiloli. When Moss and Jenkinson reached Bologna, they had crossed the Futa in 1 hour 1 minute- but had broken the record set by Giannino Marzotto in 1953.

By the time Moss and Jenkinson had reached the town of Cremona, they had extended their lead over Fangio to 30 minutes. They were once again fastest over this 115 mile (185 km) stage.

Now Moss and Jenkinson were on the final stage from Cremona to Brescia, however there was no letting up as Moss would bring the Mercedes up to 170 mph for a quick finale. At the finish, fêted by the Italian fans and surrounded by their team, the Englishmen discovered just how successful they had been. They had won the Mille Miglia, and had left all records shattered in the wake of their victorious 300SLR. In second place came Fangio driving alone in the only other 300SLR to finish 32 minutes behind. Third was the Ferrari 376 S of Umberto Maglioli/Gino Monetferrario and fourth Francesco Giardini’s 2-litre Maserati A6GCS. Moss and Jenkinson reached Brescia at 17:29; 10 hours and 7 minutes after they left Brescia at 07:22. Moss became the first and only Briton and one of the few non-Italians to win the Mille Miglia. Moss also won the Index of Performance, normally won by the smaller capacity cars.

Classification

Official Results

Of the 521 starters, 281 were classified as finishers. Therefore, only a selection of notably racers has been listed below.

Class Winners are in Bold text.

Class Winners

Standings after the race

References

Further reading

Anthony Pritchard. The Mille Miglia: The World’s Greatest Road Race. J H Haynes & Co Ltd. 
Leonardo Acerbi. Mille Miglia Story 1927-1957. Giorgio Nada Editore. 

Mille Miglia
Mille Miglia